Incurvariidae is a family of small primitive monotrysian moths in the order Lepidoptera. There are twelve genera recognised (Davis, 1999). Many species are leaf miners and much is known of their host plants, excluding Paraclemensia acerifoliella. The most familiar species in Europe are perhaps Incurvaria masculella and Phylloporia bistrigella. The narrow wings are held tightly along the body at rest and some species have very long antennae.

References

Davis, D.R. (1999). The Monotrysian Heteroneura. Ch. 6, pp. 65–90 in Kristensen, N.P. (Ed.). Lepidoptera, Moths and Butterflies. Volume 1: Evolution, Systematics, and Biogeography. Handbuch der Zoologie. Eine Naturgeschichte der Stämme des Tierreiches / Handbook of Zoology. A Natural History of the phyla of the Animal Kingdom. Band / Volume IV Arthropoda: Insecta Teilband / Part 35: 491 pp. Walter de Gruyter, Berlin, New York.

External links
Tree of Life
UK Incurvariidae key 
Jeff's UK moths
Fauna Europaea
Natural History Museum Hosts database
Available generic names Butterflies and Moths of the World Generic Names and their Type-species
LepIndex list of species and genera in family Incurvariidae
UK leaf mines
Swedish Incurvariidae
Fauna Europaea

 
Moth families